Nacaduba cyanea, the tailed green-banded line-blue, is a species of butterfly in the family Lycaenidae, and formerly considered a member of the genus Danis. It is found in the Indonesia (Irian Jaya, Maluku), Papua New Guinea, the Solomon Islands and Australia (Queensland).

The wingspan is about 30 mm. Adult males are blue with a dark brown wing margin, with a pale blue to white patch on the hindwing. Females are white, with a black border around the wings and a row of blue-edged black spots.

The larvae feed on Entada phaseoloides and Entada scandens. They are bright green, with pale brown heads. The larvae are attended to by ants of the genus Anonychomyrma. Pupation takes place in a brown pupa with dark markings.

Gallery

Subspecies
 N. c. arinia (Oberthür, 1878) (Torres Straits Islands, Cooktown to Ingham) - tailed green-banded blue
 N. c. carissima (Grose-Smith & Kirby, 1895) (Flores, Pura, Tanimbar, Timor)
 N. c. chromia (Druce, 1891) (northern Solomons)
 N. c. cyanea (Cramer, 1775) (Ambon, Seram)
 N. c. epicoritus (Boisduval, 1832) (Aru, Gebe, New Guinea, Waigeo)
 N. c. hamilcar (Grose-Smith, 1894) (Admiralty Islands, Bismarck Archipelago)
 N. c. illustris (Röber, 1886) (Kai Islands)
 N. c. murua (Tennent, 2015) (Woodlark Island)
 N. c. obiana (Fruhstorfer, 1915) (Obi)
 N. c. pindus (C. & R. Felder, [1865]) (Bacan, Halmahera, Morotai, Ternate, Salawati)
 N. c. rosselana (Bethune-Baker, 1908) (Louisade Archipelago)
 N. c. sanane (Tennent & Gassó Miracle, 2016) (Buru)
 N. c. smaragdus (Druce & Bethune-Baker, 1893) (Dammer, Wetar)

References

Butterflies described in 1775
Nacaduba
Taxa named by Pieter Cramer